{{DISPLAYTITLE:xCO2}}
XCO2 is the column-averaged of carbon dioxide in the atmosphere, represented in parts per million (ppm). Rather than taking a single observation at the surface, an integration of atmospheric CO2 above a specific location is observed. The 'X' refers to the observation taking place from a satellite platform. CO2 observing satellites cannot observe green house gasses directly, but instead average the entire atmospheric column of CO2. These estimates from satellites need ground truthing to ensure that XCO2 retrievals are accurate, with an average accuracy from OCO 2 and GOSAT of 0.267 ± 1.56 ppm between September 2014 to December 2016.

The largest recorded value XCO2 was recorded during May 2018 over the Northern Hemisphere, with a value of approximately 410 ppm. These values have been increasing steadily over recent years. Space-based CO2 measurements are used for climate-level scientific studies such as a further understanding of the El Niño–Southern Oscillation

See also 
 pCO2
 Carbon dioxide in Earth's atmosphere
  observing satellite
 Orbiting Carbon Observatory 2

References 

Carbon dioxide